Nirup Bhandari is an Indian actor who works in Kannada cinema. He made his debut in the 2015 critically and commercially acclaimed movie RangiTaranga, directed by his brother, Anup Bhandari.

Early life
Nirup Bhandari was born on 13th August in Puttur, Karnataka to Sudhakar Bhandary and Rathna Bhandary. Later the family moved to Mysore. Nirup completed his graduation (Electronics & Communication Bachelor's degree) from Vidya Vikas Institute of Engineering & Technology (VVIET), Mysore. On completion of his graduation he started working at SAP Labs India.

Career
While working at SAP, Nirup started learning acting under renowned theatre personality Ratan Thakore Grant at MiSF!T school of acting. He acted in plays and short films before venturing into films.

He debuted in Anup Bhandari's directorial debut film RangiTaranga, which also starred Radhika Narayan, Avantika Shetty and Sai Kumar.  

RangiTaranga turned out to be one of the biggest blockbusters. It also opened overseas market for Kannada films in a big way. It became the first Kannada film to release in many countries, the first Kannada film to appear on the New York Box Office Listing and the first and only Kannada film to run for 50 days in USA. RangiTaranga was also one of the 305 films shortlisted for the Academy Awards (The Oscars) but did not make it to the final nominations.

In 2018, he appeared in his second feature film Rajaratha directed by Anup Bhandari starring Avantika Shetty. The film is narrated from the point of view of a bus, which was voiced by Puneeth Rajkumar. The film was conceived by Anup Bhandari before RangiTaranga.

In 2019, Nirup's next film Aadi Lakshmi Puraana with Radhika Pandit directed by V. Priya hit theatres. The film received appreciation from family audiences.

In 2020, he completed work for his film Window Seat starring Amrutha Iyengar and Sanjana Anand.

Nirup Bhandari is currently working on his next, the big budget action adventure movie 'Vikrant Rona' where he will be sharing screen with Superstar Kichcha Sudeep. The much anticipated movie is being directed by Anup Bhandari. It also stars debutante Neetha Ashok opposite him. Although Nirup was not initially considered for the role, he was later brought in after Sudeep told Anup that Nirup would fit the role.

Personal life
Nirup is married to Dhanya. His father, Sudhakar Bhandary, used to direct television serials. He is from Saaja a small town in Puttur. His elder brother Anup Bhandari is a director, lyricist and music composer, who has worked with Nirup in almost all of his films.

Filmography

References

External links 

Living people
Indian male film actors
Kannada people
Male actors in Kannada cinema
Male actors from Bangalore
1984 births